Alexei Stanislavovich Avtonomov (born 9 March 1959 in Moscow) is a Russian legal scholar, member of UN Committee on the Elimination of Racial Discrimination since 2003. He graduated from MGIMO in 1981 and was awarded Candidate of Sciences (equivalent of PhD) degree in 1984. In 1999, he was awarded Doktor nauk degree. Since 2001, Avtonomov is a professor of the State University of Humanitarian Sciences. Since 2004, he is senior research fellow of the Institute of State and Law. Avtonomov is also a professor of the Higher School of Economics.

Sources
Biography at OHCHR portal
Personal data at National Research University Higher School of Economics website
Personal data at Institute of State and Law website

1959 births
Russian legal scholars
Members of the Committee on the Elimination of Racial Discrimination
Living people
Academic staff of the Higher School of Economics
Russian officials of the United Nations